Pool B of the 2011 Rugby World Cup began on 10 September 2011 and was completed on 2 October. The pool was composed of the 2007 runners-up England, as well as the third-placed team from 2007, Argentina, and Georgia, Romania and Scotland.

Overall

All times are local New Zealand time (UTC+12 until 24 September, UTC+13 from 25 September)

Scotland vs Romania

Argentina vs England

Scotland vs Georgia

Argentina vs Romania

England vs Georgia

England vs Romania

Argentina vs Scotland

Georgia vs Romania

England vs Scotland

Argentina vs Georgia

References

External links
Pool B at rugbyworldcup.com

Pool B
2010–11 in English rugby union
2010–11 in Scottish rugby union
2010–11 in Romanian rugby union
2011 in Argentine rugby union
rugby union